The following is an alphabetical list of members of the United States House of Representatives from the state of Indiana.  For chronological tables of members of both houses of the United States Congress from the state (through the present day), see United States congressional delegations from Indiana.

Current representatives 
As of January 2023
 : Frank J. Mrvan (D) (since 2021)
 : Rudy Yakym (R) (since 2022)
 : Jim Banks (R) (since 2017)
 : Jim Baird (R) (since 2019)
 : Victoria Spartz (R) (since 2021)
 : Greg Pence (R) (since 2019)
 : André Carson (D) (since 2008)
 : Larry Bucshon (R) (since 2011)
 : Erin Houchin (R) (since 2023)

List of members and delegates

See also

 United States congressional delegations from Indiana
 List of United States senators from Indiana
 Indiana's congressional districts

External links 
House of Representatives List of Members

 
Indiana
United States representatives